The 2022–23 NBA G League season is the 22nd season of the NBA G League, the minor league basketball league of the National Basketball Association (NBA).
For the second consecutive season, the schedule will be split into two parts: the 18-game Showcase Cup which began on November 4, 2022, followed by a 32-game regular season which tips off on December 27. The NBA G League Finals will happen in April 2023.

Structure 
The Showcase Cup began on November 4, 2022, and it will end with a single-elimination tournament to crown a champion at the G League's Winter Showcase from December 19 to 22. During the Showcase Cup, teams are separated into four regional pods and play 16 games against one another in each respective NBA G League markets. The teams with the best winning percentage in each regional pod, along with the next four teams across the league with the best win-percentages, will advance to compete for the Showcase Cup during Winter Showcase.

Notable occurrences 

 Each game that ends in overtime had an Elam ending, with a "target score" of seven points to win the game.
 The NBA G League Ignite debuted its new home arena, The Dollar Loan Center, in Henderson, Nevada, on November 6 against the Oklahoma City Blue.
 The Capitanes de Ciudad de México hosted the first-ever NBA G League regular season game played in México at the Arena Ciudad de México when it took on the defending champion Rio Grande Valley Vipers on November 6.
 The Agua Caliente Clippers were renamed to the Ontario Clippers for the 2022–23 season.

Winter Showcase

Standings

Central

East

South

West

Showcase Cup

Statistics 

Source: NBA G League Stats.

References 

 
Current basketball seasons